Peter James Breen (born 4 November 1947) is a former Australian politician. He was a solicitor before entering politics, achieving a Diploma of Law from Sydney University. He was originally a member of the Liberal Party, serving as President of the Campbelltown Young Liberals 1971–1972. From 1995 to 1998 he was Secretary of the Australian Bill of Rights Group, and in 1998 joined Reform the Legal System. In the 1999 New South Wales election he was elected to the Legislative Council.

Breen joined the Labor Party on 5 May 2006, but resigned on 18 July to form the Human Rights Party. He unsuccessfully contested the 2007 New South Wales state election.

In 2014 Breen became an adviser to Senator Ricky Muir of the Australian Motoring Enthusiast Party but was sacked on 5 August 2014. He has campaigned over an alleged miscarriage of justice in the conviction of Stephen Wayne 'Shorty' Jamieson for the 1988 murder of Janine Balding.

Renewable Energy Party

In 2016, Breen was a key person in the Renewable Energy Party and candidate for the Australian Senate to represent New South Wales in the Australian federal election.

The Renewable Energy Party was an Australian political party registered by the Australian Electoral Commission on 22 March 2016.

In the 2016 federal election the Renewable Energy Party fielded two senate candidates in each of New South Wales, Queensland, Tasmania, Victoria and Western Australia, and a total of eight candidates for the House of Representatives in Victoria (4), Tasmania (3) and New South Wales (1), none of whom were elected.

On 1 February 2018, the Australian Electoral Commission issued a notice that it was considering deregistering the party on the grounds that it had ceased to have at least 500 members. On 26 March 2018, the party was deregistered due to failure to respond to the earlier notice.

References

1947 births
Living people
Members of the New South Wales Legislative Council
Place of birth missing (living people)
Australian Labor Party members of the Parliament of New South Wales
21st-century Australian politicians